Tryvann stadion was a speed skating rink located at Tryvannshøyden in Oslo, Norway.

Traditionally the main speed skating venues in Oslo was Frogner stadion and Bislett stadion. In 1933, the city council decided to build a skating rink at Tryvann to allow for a longer season. This allowed the skating season to last from 1 November to 1 April. Transport was available via the Holmenkollen Line. During the 1952 Winter Olympics, the venue was designated as a reserve venue for Bislett, but never used. During the 1970s, the venue was demolished to make room for parking.

References

Sports venues in Oslo
Speed skating venues in Norway
Venues of the 1952 Winter Olympics
1933 establishments in Norway